Alyson Regina Annan  (born 12 June 1973) is an Australian field hockey coach and retired field hockey player, who earned a total number of 228 international caps for the Women's National Team, in which she scored 166 goals. Until January 2022, Annan was the head coach of the Netherlands women's national field hockey team; she led the team to a silver medal at the 2016 Summer Olympics in Brazil and a gold medal at 2020 Summer Olympics in Tokyo as well as gold medals at the 2017 and the 2021 Women's EuroHockey Nations Championship in The Netherlands. During 2013 Annan gained the prestigious award of becoming a member of Sport Australia Hall of Fame.She is currently head coach of the China Women's National team.

Biography
Annan was born on 12 June 1973 in Wentworthville, New South Wales. She was voted the Best Female Hockey Player in the World in 1999. In the following year, she led the Australian team to gold at the 2000 Summer Olympics. She subsequently retired from international competition and moved to the Netherlands. In the Netherlands she played for HC Klein Zwitserland from The Hague. She retired in 2003, becoming the coach of Dutch league team HC Klein Zwitserland. In 2004, she was an assistant of Dutch Head Coach Marc Lammers at the 2004 Summer Olympics in Athens, Greece, when the Netherlands won silver.

Annan was married to Argentinian hockey player, Maximiliano Caldas. After their divorce her partner became Carole Thate, a former Dutch hockey captain and fellow Olympic medallist. Annan and Thate had their first child, Sam Henk Brian Thate, in May 2007. Their second son, Cooper Thate, was born in October 2008.

Annan was to be the coach of the first women's team of the Amsterdamsche Hockey & Bandy Club during the 2012–2013 season.

In 2013 Annan was inducted into the Sport Australia Hall of Fame.

In October 2015 she was named as head coach of the Netherlands women's team, succeeding Sjoerd Marijne. Annan's former husband Max Caldas previously coached the Netherlands women's team to a gold medal at the 2012 Olympic Games. During the
2016 games in Rio de Janeiro Annan coached her team to a silver medal losing to the Great Britain Team after shoot-outs in the final.

Major international tournaments
 2000 Olympic Games Gold Medal
 1996 Olympic Games Gold Medal
 1992 Olympic Games 5th
 1998 Hockey World Cup Gold Medal
 1994 Hockey World Cup Gold Medal
 2001 Champions Trophy 3rd
 2000 Champions Trophy 3rd
 1999 Champions Trophy Gold Medal
 1997 Champions Trophy Gold Medal
 1995 Champions Trophy Gold Medal
 1993 Champions Trophy Gold Medal
 1998 Commonwealth Games Gold Medal
 1993 Junior Hockey World Cup Silver Medal

Awards
 1994 Team of the Year Australian Sports Awards
 1995 Team of the Year Australian Sports Awards
 1996 Team of the Year Australian Sports Awards
 1996 Player of the Year Australian Women's Hockey Association
 1996 Player of the Series Australian Hockey League
 1996 New South Wales Sportswoman of the Year
 1996 New South Wales Athlete of the Year
 1996 Order of Australia Medal
 1997 Team of the Year Australian Sports Awards
 1997 Player of the Year Australian Women's Hockey Association
 1997 Player of the Tournament Champions Trophy
 1998 Team of the Year Australian Sports Awards
 1998 International Player of the Year International Hockey Federation
 1998 Player of the Tournament Hockey World Cup
 1998 Finalist World Sportswoman of the Year Women's Sport Foundation (USA)
 2000 International Player of the Year International Hockey Federation
 2002 Player of the Year Dutch League
 2003 Player of the Year Dutch League
 '''2013 Sport Australia Hall of Fame inductee

References

External links
 
 
 
 
 
 
 Profile on ABC Australia

1973 births
Living people
Australian female field hockey players
Australian field hockey coaches
Commonwealth Games gold medallists for Australia
Field hockey players at the 1992 Summer Olympics
Field hockey players at the 1996 Summer Olympics
Australian LGBT sportspeople
Olympic field hockey players of Australia
Olympic gold medalists for Australia
Olympic medalists in field hockey
Sportswomen from New South Wales
Recipients of the Medal of the Order of Australia
LGBT field hockey players
Field hockey players at the 2000 Summer Olympics
Medalists at the 2000 Summer Olympics
Medalists at the 1996 Summer Olympics
Commonwealth Games medallists in field hockey
Expatriate field hockey players
Australian expatriate sportspeople in the Netherlands
HC Klein Zwitserland players
Field hockey players at the 1998 Commonwealth Games
Bisexual sportspeople
21st-century Australian LGBT people
Sport Australia Hall of Fame inductees
Sportspeople from Sydney
Field hockey people from New South Wales
Medallists at the 1998 Commonwealth Games